This is a list of the preserved important buildings in the city of Arequipa, in Peru.

Arequipa is a UNESCO World Heritage Site inscribed as "Historical Centre of the City of Arequipa".

List

References

 
Arequipa
List

Areq
Areq